Sainte-Colombe, sometimes referred to as Sainte-Colombe-lès-Vienne, is a commune in the Rhône department in eastern France.

See also
Communes of the Rhône department
Maurice Luiset

References

Communes of Rhône (department)